The Love Hour is a 1925 American silent drama film directed by Herman C. Raymaker and starring Huntley Gordon, Louise Fazenda and Willard Louis.

Cast
 Huntley Gordon as Rex Westmore 
 Louise Fazenda as Jenny Tibbs 
 Willard Louis as Gus Yerger 
 Ruth Clifford as Betty Brown 
 John Roche as Ward Ralston 
 Charles Farrell as Kid Lewis 
 Gayne Whitman as Attorney

References

Bibliography
 Monaco, James. The Encyclopedia of Film. Perigee Books, 1991.

External links

1925 films
1925 drama films
Silent American drama films
Films directed by Herman C. Raymaker
American silent feature films
1920s English-language films
American black-and-white films
1920s American films